Saint-Jacques-le-Mineur is a municipality in the Jardins de Napierville Regional County Municipality in Quebec, Canada, situated in the Montérégie administrative region. The population as of the Canada 2011 Census was 1,672.

Demographics

Population

Language

See also
List of municipalities in Quebec

References

Incorporated places in Les Jardins-de-Napierville Regional County Municipality
Municipalities in Quebec